The 12th season of the television series Arthur was originally broadcast on PBS in the United States from October 6, 2008 to April 24, 2009 and contains 20 episodes. The 10 episodes listed below were broadcast as season 12, and the other 10 were broadcast as season 13. This resulted all of season 13 episodes airing in several countries such as Canada and United Kingdom for many months prior the U.S. broadcast. This season was created and originally aired in the 16:9 widescreen format though still in 480i; in the U.S., they were and continued to be aired in 4:3, with the left and right sides cropped out. The animation was produced by Animation Services HK Ltd. instead of by AKOM. This was also the first season where Michael Hirsh was credited as the executive producer.

Joan Rivers guest starred as Francine's grandmother and Camel on the season's premiere episode "Is That Kosher?". Lance Armstrong guest starred in the episode "Room to Ride" as himself. Dallas Jokic replaced Cameron Ansell as the voice of Arthur, and Lyle O'Donohoe replaced Paul-Stuart Brown as the voice of Brain.

Episodes

References 

General references 
 
 
 
 

2008 American television seasons
2009 American television seasons
Arthur (TV series) seasons
2008 Canadian television seasons
2009 Canadian television seasons